Britain's Great War is a British documentary television series that broadcast on BBC One 27 January 2014. The documentary series is presented by Jeremy Paxman and was produced by the Open University and BBC Productions. The series shows how World War I affected Britain and its people. The series leads the BBC World War I centenary season.

Production
Jeremy Paxman, the presenter of the series, said: "The trouble with so much of our understanding of World War One is that it is seen through the prism of the prejudices of the hundred years which have followed it. It's an amazing and important story which deserves to be viewed afresh." A re-version of the series will be released for BBC Learning. The series consists of four hour-long episodes.

Episode list

Media
The television series is an accompaniment to Jeremy Paxman's book Great Britain's Great War.

Reception

Ratings
The four episodes had viewing audiences of 17.4%, 12.7%, 13.2% and 12.9% respectively.

Critical reception
David Chater of The Times called the series "superb" and said it "does justice to the unimaginable scale of a cataclysm". Clarissa Tan from The Spectator said Paxman presented "with assuredness and gravitas". Hugo Rifkind, another journalist for The Times, said: "Documentaries must cater for those who know lots and those who know nothing. Jeremy Paxman gets the balance right". John Crace writing in The Guardian described the series as disconnected. He went on to describe it as if there was a contextual void at the centre. It wasn't that the series demanded a great historical debate on the causes of the war – though it did seem perverse that the assassination of Archduke Ferdinand, the Balkans or European imperialism didn't get a mention. However Nigel H. Jones, writing for The Daily Telegraph, commented on how moving the series was, defying his low expectations.

After the second episode was shown, Jeremy Paxman faced a furious backlash after calling the extreme conscientious objectors in the First World War "cranks". The Belfast Telegraph reported a spokesman for the campaign group Peace Pledge Union describing Paxman's remarks as "unhelpful and silly". The spokesman then went on to say "One of the main issues they felt strongly about was the coercive power of the state to force people to kill, and if that is cranky I wish there were more of them. It seems to me a very laudable thing to do."

References

External links
 
 
 
 Open University website

2014 British television series debuts
2014 British television series endings
2010s British documentary television series
English-language television shows
Documentary films about World War I
BBC television documentaries about history during the 20th Century